is a railway station on Kintetsu Kashihara Line and Osaka Lines in Kashihara, Nara, Japan, operated by Kintetsu Railway. It is a major station on the lines to and from Osaka, Nara, Kyoto, and Nagoya.

Lines
Yamato-Yagi Station is served by the Osaka Line and Kashihara Line.

Station layout
The station has two island platforms serving four tracks (1 to 4) for the Osaka Line on the upper level, and two side platforms serving two tracks (5 and 6) for the Kashihara Line on the ground level.

Platforms

Adjacent stations

History
The station opened on 21 March 1925 on the Osaka Line.

Passenger statistics
Yamato-Yagi Station handles over 37,000 passengers daily.

Surrounding area
 Kashihara City Office
 Kintetsu Department Store
 National Route 24

References

External links

 Kintetsu station information 

Railway stations in Japan opened in 1923
Railway stations in Nara Prefecture